The 1867 Maine gubernatorial election was held on September 9, 1867. Incumbent Republican Governor and war hero Joshua Chamberlain defeated the Democratic candidate Eben F. Pillsbury.

General election

Candidates

Republican 

 Joshua Chamberlain

Democratic 

 Eben F. Pillsbury

Results 
Chamberlain won reelection to a second term, and won a majority of 11,723 votes.

References 

Maine gubernatorial elections
Maine
1867 Maine elections